Franklin Wadja (born 1 May 1995) is a Cameroonian professional footballer who plays as a midfielder for French club Caen in the Ligue 2.

Career
Wadja made his professional debut for Lorient in a 1–1 Ligue 2 tie with Quevilly-Rouen on 29 July 2017.

On 9 July 2021, he signed a two-year contract with Caen.

References

External links
 Franklin Wadja at FC Lorient
 
 
 

1994 births
Living people
Footballers from Douala
Cameroonian footballers
FC Lorient players
Stade Malherbe Caen players
Ligue 1 players
Ligue 2 players
Association football midfielders
Cameroonian expatriate footballers
Cameroonian expatriate sportspeople in France
Expatriate footballers in France